The two-colored snail-eater (Dipsas bicolor), is a non-venomous snake found in Honduras, Nicaragua, and Costa Rica.

References

Dipsas
Snakes of North America
Reptiles of Honduras
Reptiles of Nicaragua
Reptiles of Costa Rica
Reptiles described in 1895
Taxa named by Albert Günther